Mangum Township is one of six townships in Durham County, North Carolina, United States. The township had a population of 5,821 according to the 2000 census.

Geographically, Mangum Township occupies  in northern Durham County.  The township contains small portions of the city of Durham, as well as the unincorporated communities of Bahama and Rougemont.

It includes a portion of the Federal Bureau of Prisons Federal Correctional Complex, Butner.

References

Townships in Durham County, North Carolina
Townships in North Carolina